Kovachev (also transliterated Kovačev) is a Bulgarian surname originating from the word Kovach, meaning blacksmith. Notable people with the surname include:
Andrey Kovatchev
Bogomil Petrov Kovachev
Boris Kovatchev
Georgi Kovachev
Martin Kovachev
Nikola Kovachev
Pavel Kovachev
Petar Kovachev
Stiliyan Kovachev
Valentin Kovachev

See also
Kovačev (Ковачев), surname
Kovach (surname) (Ковач; also translit. Kovač), surname
Kovachich (Ковачич; also translit. Kovačič), a surname
Kovachevich (Ковачевич; also translit. Kovačevič), a surname
Kovachevski (Ковачевски; also translit. Kovačevski), a surname
Kovachenko (Коваченко; also translit. Kovačenko), a surname

References

Bulgarian-language surnames
English-language surnames